This is a list of the number-one hits of 1991 on Italian Hit Parade Singles Chart.

References

1991
One
1991 record charts